Chautemsia is a genus of flowering plants belonging to the family Gesneriaceae.

Its native range is Southeastern Brazil.

Species:
 Chautemsia calcicola A.O.Araujo & V.C.Souza

References

Gesnerioideae
Gesneriaceae genera